Hamara is a town in the southwestern Gedo region of Somalia. It is also known for having hot weather

References

Populated places in Gedo